Loco is a live performance album by GOD, released in 1991 by Pathological Records.

Track listing

Personnel
Adapted from the Loco liner notes.

GOD
Steve Blake – tenor saxophone
Lou Ciccotelli – drums
Dave Cochrane – bass guitar
John Edwards – double bass
Tim Hodgkinson – alto saxophone
Gary Jeff – bass guitar
Scott Kiehl – drums
Kevin Martin – lead vocals, tenor saxophone, cover art
Russell Smith – guitar

Additional musicians and production
Justin Broadrick – production
Eddie Prévost – percussion

Release history

References

External links 
 

1991 live albums
God (British band) albums
Albums produced by Justin Broadrick